Norma Ann Winstone MBE (born 23 September 1941) is an English jazz singer and lyricist. With a career spanning more than 50 years, she is best known for her wordless improvisations. Musicians with whom she has worked include Michael Garrick, John Surman, Michael Gibbs, Mike Westbrook, as well as pianist John Taylor, who was her former husband.

Biography

Early years and education
Born as Norma Ann Short in Bow, East London, England, she was 10 years old when her family moved to Dagenham, Essex. Encouraged by her primary school teacher, she applied for and won a scholarship to attend Saturday-school at Trinity Music College, and after passing her 11-plus exams, she went to Dagenham County High School (where Dudley Moore was then a senior pupil). Like Moore, her music teacher there was Peter Cork (1926–2012). At the age of 17 she discovered jazz, listening to Ella Fitzgerald and Oscar Peterson being played on Radio Luxembourg.

Career
Winstone began singing in bands around Dagenham in the early 1960s, and has said of her early experiences: "I've always been on the edge, always felt like I was swimming against the tide and somehow couldn't stop. I met a pianist called Chris Goody and we'd get together and play things. He knew Margaret Busby who was in a publishing company called Alison and Busby. She also wrote lyrics for tunes like 'Naima'. I was inspired by her, though I didn't write words myself at that time, I didn't think I could." Winstone first attracted attention when in the late 1960s she appeared at Ronnie Scott's Jazz Club sharing the bill with Roland Kirk. Interviewed in 2020, she said: "I went along to a gig at the Charlie Chester Club and I sat in with a drummer called John Stevens and he was incredibly enthusiastic and jumped up and said, 'I'm going to tell Ronnie Scott about you, he should give you an audition!' ... Eventually, I went to the club, and after reminding Ronnie that eight months before he promised to invite me for an audition, we got it and he gave me four weeks there opposite Roland Kirk. I think I was on cloud nine...." This led to her first radio BBC broadcast, which by chance was heard by singer Carmen McRae on a visit from the US, who met Winstone and was interviewed for a jazz magazine with her.

Winstone joined Michael Garrick's band in 1968. Her first recording came the following year, with Joe Harriott and Amancio D'Silva, on Hum-Dono (reissued in 2015). In 1971 she was voted top singer in the Melody Maker Jazz Poll. She recorded the album Edge of Time under her own name in 1972. Winstone contributed vocals to Ian Carr's Nucleus on that band's 1973 release Labyrinth, a jazz-rock concept album based on the Greek myth about the Minotaur. 

Winstone has worked with many major European musicians and visiting Americans, as well as with most of her peers in British jazz, including Garrick, John Surman, Michael Gibbs, Mike Westbrook and her former husband, the pianist John Taylor. With Taylor and trumpeter Kenny Wheeler she performed and recorded three albums for ECM as a member of the trio Azimuth between 1977 and 1980; their fifth and last album How It Was Then… Never Again (1995) was given four stars by DownBeat magazine.

Her own 1987 album Somewhere Called Home, also released on the ECM label, has often been called "a classic". The review by AllMusic said: "It's not only a watermark of Winstone's career but, in the long line of modern vocal outings released since the romantic vocal tradition of Fitzgerald and Vaughan ended with free jazz and fusion, the disc stands out as one most original yet idyllic of vocal jazz recordings. ... A must for fans looking for something as cozy as a golden age chanteuse, but without all the gymnastic scatting and carbon copy ways of many a contemporary jazz singer." In addition, she made albums with the American pianists Jimmy Rowles – Well Kept Secret, recorded in 1993 – and Fred Hersch. On Well Kept Secret Winstone sang lyrics she had written to Rowles' composition "The Peacocks", which she had heard on the Bill Evans album You Must Believe in Spring (1981). With the title "A Timeless Place", Winstone's lyrics were subsequently recorded by others, including Mark Murphy. Well respected as a lyricist, she has also written words to tunes by Ralph Towner, Egberto Gismonti, Ivan Lins, Steve Swallow, and other musicians.

In 2001, Winstone was honoured as "Best Vocalist" in the BBC Jazz Awards, also being nominated in 2007 and 2008.

In February 2018, Winstone released Descansado: Songs for Films, a collection that AllMusic described as "an unusual and provocative album".

In 2019, Enodoc Records released the CD In Concert, a remastered recording of an August 1988 performance by Winstone and her ex-husband John Taylor at London's Guildhall School of Music and Drama, including music by Leonard Bernstein, Steve Swallow, Egberto Gismonti, Ralph Towner and Dave Brubeck, among others, with lyrics by Winstone herself, Johnny Mercer and Margaret Busby. Awarding four stars to this collaboration between Winstone and Taylor, Roger Farbey of All About Jazz wrote: "What In Concert demonstrates above all else is the extraordinarily synergistic relationship that this virtuosic pair shared."

Personal life
In 1972, Winstone married pianist John Taylor, whom she had met in 1966; they divorced after some years, although they later continued their musical partnership. Their two sons, Alex and Leo, are both musicians.

Awards and honours
 1971: voted top singer in the Melody Maker Jazz Poll
 2001: "Best Vocalist" in BBC Jazz Awards
 2007: MBE in the Queen's Birthday Honours
 2009: Skoda Jazz Ahead Award in Bremen for contribution to European Jazz
 2010: London Awards for Art and Performance
 2010: Lifetime Achievement Jazz Medal from the Worshipful Company of Musicians
 2010: Honorary Fellow at Trinity Laban Conservatoire
 2013: Honorary Member of the Royal Academy of Music
 2015: Jazz Vocalist of the Year, Parliamentary Jazz Awards
 2015: BASCA Gold Badge Award
 2017: Jazz FM Award for Vocalist of the year

Discography

As leader
 Edge of Time (Argo, 1972)
 Live at Roncella Jonica, with Kenny Wheeler (Izemz/Polis, 1985)
 Somewhere Called Home (ECM, 1987)
 M.A.P., with John Wolfe Brennan (L+R, 1990)
 Far to Go (Grappa, 1993)
 Well Kept Secret (Hot House, 1995)
 Siren's Song, with Kenny Wheeler (Justin Time, 1997)
 Manhattan in the Rain (Sunnyside, 1998)
 Like Song, Like Weather, with John Taylor (Koch, 1999)
 Songs & Lullabies, with Fred Hersch (Sunnyside, 2003)
 Chamber Music (EmArcy, 2003)
 It's Later Than You Think with the NDR Big Band (Provocateur, 2006)
 Children of Time, with Michael Garrick (Jazz Academy, 2006)
 Amoroso... ..Only More So, with Stan Tracey (Trio, 2007)
 Distances (ECM, 2008)
 Yet Another Spring, with Michael Garrick (Jazz Academy, 2009)
 Stories Yet to Tell (ECM, 2010)
 Mirrors with Kenny Wheeler (Edition, 2013)
 Dance Without Answer (ECM, 2014)
 Descansado: Songs for Films (ECM, 2018)
 In Concert, with John Taylor, 1988 (Enodoc Records, 2019)

With Azimuth
 Azimuth (ECM, 1977)
 The Touchstone (ECM, 1978)
 Départ (with Ralph Towner) (ECM, 1979)
 Azimuth '85 (ECM, 1985)
 How It Was Then... Never Again (ECM, 1995)

As guest

With Joe Harriott and Amancio D'Silva
 Hum-Dono  (Columbia UK, 1969)

With Nucleus
 Labyrinth (Vertigo, 1973)

With Paul Rutherford and Iskra 1912
 Sequences 72 & 73 (Emanem, 1997)

With Eberhard Weber
 Fluid Rustle (ECM, 1979)

With Kenny Wheeler
 Song for Someone (Incus, 1973)
 Music for Large and Small Ensembles (ECM, 1990)

References

External links
 – official website
Norma Winstone in The Guardian
"Norma Winstone", Improvised Music Company.
"10 Tracks by Norma Winstone I Can't Do Without… by vocalist/composer Nicky Schrire", London Jazz News, 20 May 2021.
"Birthday Wishes and Greetings for Norma Winstone at 80", London Jazz News, 23 September 2021.
John Devenish, "For Norma Winstone, the voice is an instrument", Jazz.FM91, 9 March 2022.

1941 births
Living people
20th-century English singers
20th-century English women singers
21st-century English singers
21st-century English women singers
Alumni of Trinity Laban Conservatoire of Music and Dance
Azimuth (band) members
British women jazz singers
ECM Records artists
Edition Records artists
EmArcy Records artists
English jazz singers
English lyricists
Members of the Order of the British Empire
Nucleus (band) members
Sunnyside Records artists